Bryce Canyon National Park is an American national park located in southwestern Utah. The major feature of the park is Bryce Canyon, which despite its name, is not a canyon, but a collection of giant natural amphitheaters along the eastern side of the Paunsaugunt Plateau. Bryce is distinctive due to geological structures called hoodoos, formed by frost weathering and stream erosion of the river and lake bed sedimentary rocks. The red, orange, and white colors of the rocks provide spectacular views for park visitors. Bryce Canyon National Park is much smaller and sits at a much higher elevation than nearby Zion National Park.

The Bryce Canyon area was settled by Mormon pioneers in the 1850s and was named after Ebenezer Bryce, who homesteaded in the area in 1874. The area around Bryce Canyon was originally designated as a national monument by President Warren G. Harding in 1923 and was redesignated as a national park by Congress in 1928. In 2018, Bryce Canyon received 2,679,478 recreational visitors, which was an increase of 107,794 visitors from the prior year.

Geography
Bryce Canyon National Park lies within the Colorado Plateau geographic province of North America and straddles the southeastern edge of the Paunsaugunt Plateau west of the Paunsaugunt Faults (Paunsaugunt is Paiute for "home of the beaver"). Park visitors arrive from the plateau part of the park and look over the plateau's edge toward a valley containing the fault and the Paria River just beyond it (Paria is Paiute for "muddy or elk water"). The edge of the Kaiparowits Plateau bounds the opposite side of the valley.

Bryce Canyon was not formed from erosion initiated from a central stream, meaning it technically is not a canyon. Instead headward erosion has excavated large amphitheater-shaped features in the Cenozoic-aged rocks of the Paunsaugunt Plateau.

From there, Aquarius Plateau, Bryce Amphitheater, the Henry Mountains, the Vermilion Cliffs and the White Cliffs can be seen.

Climate

According to the Köppen climate classification system, Bryce Canyon National Park has a continental climate with warm, dry summers (Dsb). Dsb climates are defined by their coldest month having an average mean temperature below , all months with an average mean temperature below , at least four months with an average mean temperature above , and three times as much precipitation in the wettest winter month compared to the driest summer month.

History

Native American habitation
Little is known about early human habitation in the Bryce Canyon area. Archaeological surveys of Bryce Canyon National Park and the Paunsaugunt Plateau show that people have been in the area for at least 10,000 years. Basketmaker Anasazi artifacts several thousand years old have been found south of the park. Other artifacts from the Pueblo-period Anasazi and the Fremont culture (up to the mid-12th century) have also been found.

The Paiute Native Americans moved into the surrounding valleys and plateaus in the area around the same time that the other cultures left. These Native Americans hunted and gathered for most of their food, but also supplemented their diet with some cultivated products. The Paiute in the area developed a mythology surrounding the hoodoos (pinnacles) in Bryce Canyon. They believed that hoodoos were the Legend People whom the trickster Coyote turned to stone. At least one older Paiute said his culture called the hoodoos Anka-ku-was-a-wits, which is Paiute for "red painted faces".

European American exploration and settlement

It was not until the late 18th and the early 19th century that the first European Americans explored the remote and hard-to-reach area. Mormon scouts visited the area in the 1850s to gauge its potential for agricultural development, use for grazing, and settlement.

The first major scientific expedition to the area was led by U.S. Army Major John Wesley Powell in 1872. Powell, along with a team of mapmakers and geologists, surveyed the Sevier and Virgin River area as part of a larger survey of the Colorado Plateaus. His mapmakers kept many of the Paiute place names.

Small groups of Mormon pioneers followed and attempted to settle east of Bryce Canyon along the Paria River. In 1873, the Kanarra Cattle Company started to use the area for cattle grazing.

The Church of Jesus Christ of Latter-day Saints sent Scottish immigrant Ebenezer Bryce and his wife Mary to settle land in the Paria Valley because they thought his carpentry skills would be useful in the area. The Bryce family chose to live right below Bryce Amphitheater—the main collection of hoodoos in the park. Bryce grazed his cattle inside what are now park borders, and reputedly thought that the amphitheaters were a "helluva place to lose a cow." He also built a road to the plateau to retrieve firewood and timber, and a canal to irrigate his crops and water his animals. Other settlers soon started to call the unusual place "Bryce's canyon", which was later formalized into Bryce Canyon.

A combination of drought, overgrazing and flooding eventually drove the remaining Paiutes from the area and prompted the settlers to attempt construction of a water diversion channel from the Sevier River drainage. When that effort failed, most of the settlers, including the Bryce family, left the area. Bryce moved his family to Arizona in 1880. The remaining settlers dug a  ditch from the Sevier's east fork into Tropic Valley.

Creation of the park

These scenic areas were first described for the public in magazine articles published by Union Pacific and Santa Fe railroads in 1916. People like Forest Supervisor J. W. Humphrey promoted the scenic wonders of Bryce Canyon's amphitheaters, and by 1918 nationally distributed articles also helped to spark interest. However, poor access to the remote area and the lack of accommodations kept visitation to a bare minimum.

Ruby Syrett, Harold Bowman and the Perry brothers later built modest lodging, and set up "touring services" in the area. Syrett later served as the first postmaster of Bryce Canyon. Visitation steadily increased, and by the early 1920s the Union Pacific Railroad became interested in expanding rail service into southwestern Utah to accommodate more tourists.

At the same time, conservationists became alarmed by the damage overgrazing, logging, and unregulated visitation were having on the fragile features of Bryce Canyon. A movement to have the area protected was soon started, and National Park Service Director Stephen Mather responded by proposing that Bryce Canyon be made into a state park. The governor of Utah and the Utah State Legislature, however, lobbied for national protection of the area. Mather relented and sent his recommendation to President Warren G. Harding, who on June 8, 1923, declared Bryce Canyon a national monument.

A road was built the same year on the plateau to provide easy access to outlooks over the amphitheaters. From 1924 to 1925, Bryce Canyon Lodge was built from local timber and stone.

Members of the United States Congress started work in 1924 on upgrading Bryce Canyon's protection status from a national monument to a national park in order to establish Utah National Park. A process led by the Utah Parks Company for transferring ownership of private and state-held land in the monument to the federal government started in 1923. The last of the land in the proposed park's borders was sold to the federal government four years later, and on February 25, 1928, the renamed Bryce Canyon National Park was established.

In 1931, President Herbert Hoover annexed an adjoining area south of the park, and in 1942 an additional  was added. Rim Road, the scenic drive that is still used today, was completed in 1934 by the Civilian Conservation Corps. Administration of the park was conducted from neighboring Zion National Park until 1956, when Bryce Canyon's first superintendent started work.

More recent history
The USS Bryce Canyon, which was named for the park, served as a supply and repair ship in the U.S. Pacific Fleet from September 15, 1950, to June 30, 1981.

Bryce Canyon Natural History Association (BCNHA) was established in 1961. It runs the bookstore inside the park visitor center and is a non-profit organization created to aid the interpretive, educational and scientific activities of the National Park Service at Bryce Canyon National Park. A portion of the profits from all bookstore sales are donated to public land units. 

Responding to increased visitation and traffic congestion, the National Park Service implemented a voluntary, summer-only, in-park shuttle system in June 2000. In 2004, reconstruction began on the aging and inadequate road system in the park.

On April 7, 2020, Bryce Canyon National Park was closed to help prevent the spread of COVID-19.

The park's phased reopening started on May 6, 2020.

Geology

The Bryce Canyon area shows a record of deposition that spans from the last part of the Cretaceous period and the first half of the Cenozoic era. The ancient depositional environment of the region around what is now the park varied. The Dakota Sandstone and the Tropic Shale were deposited in the warm, shallow waters of the advancing and retreating Cretaceous Seaway (outcrops of these rocks are found just outside park borders). The colorful Claron Formation, from which the park's delicate hoodoos are carved, was laid down as sediments in a system of cool streams and lakes that existed from 63 to about 40 million years ago (from the Paleocene to the Eocene epochs). Different sediment types were laid down as the lakes deepened and became shallow and as the shoreline and river deltas migrated.

Several other formations were also created but were mostly eroded away following two major periods of uplift. The Laramide orogeny affected the entire western part of what would become North America starting about 70 million to 50 million years ago. This event helped to build the Rocky Mountains and in the process closed the Cretaceous Seaway. The Straight Cliffs, Wahweap, and Kaiparowits formations were victims of this uplift. The Colorado Plateaus were uplifted 16 million years ago and were segmented into different plateaus, each separated from its neighbors by faults and each having its own uplift rate. The Boat Mesa Conglomerate and the Sevier River Formation were removed by erosion following this uplift.

This uplift created vertical joints, which over time were preferentially eroded. The soft Pink Cliffs of the Claron Formation were eroded to form freestanding pinnacles in badlands called hoodoos, while the more resistant White Cliffs formed monoliths. The brown, pink and red colors are from hematite (iron oxide); the yellows from limonite; and the purples are from pyrolusite.  Also created were arches, natural bridges, walls, and windows. Hoodoos are composed of soft sedimentary rock and are topped by a piece of harder, less easily eroded stone that protects the column from the elements. Bryce Canyon has one of the highest concentrations of hoodoos of any place on Earth.

The formations exposed in the area of the park are part of the Grand Staircase. The oldest members of this supersequence of rock units are exposed in the Grand Canyon, the intermediate ones in Zion National Park, and its youngest parts are laid bare in Bryce Canyon area. A small amount of overlap occurs in and around each park.

Ecology

More than 400 native plant species live in the park. There are three life zones in the park based on elevation:  the lowest areas of the park are dominated by dwarf forests of pinyon pine and juniper with manzanita, serviceberry, and antelope bitterbrush in between. Aspen, cottonwood, water birch, and willow grow along streams. Ponderosa pine forests cover the mid-elevations with blue spruce and Douglas fir in water-rich areas and manzanita and bitterbrush as underbrush. Douglas fir and white fir, along with aspen and Engelmann spruce, make up the forests on the Paunsaugunt Plateau. The harshest areas have limber pine and ancient Great Basin bristlecone pine, some more than 1,600 years old, holding on.

The forests and meadows of Bryce Canyon provide the habitat to support diverse animal life including foxes, badgers, porcupines, elk, skunks, black bears, bobcats, and woodpeckers. Mule deer are the most common large mammals in the park. Elk and pronghorn, which have been reintroduced nearby, sometimes venture into the park.

Bryce Canyon National Park forms part of the habitat of three wildlife species that are listed under the Endangered Species Act: the Utah prairie dog, the California condor, and the southwestern willow flycatcher.  The Utah prairie dog is a threatened species that was reintroduced to the park for conservation, and the largest protected population is found within the park's boundaries.

About 170 species of birds visit the park each year, including swifts and swallows. Most species migrate to warmer regions in winter, although jays, ravens, nuthatches, eagles, and owls stay. In winter, the mule deer, cougars, and coyotes migrate to lower elevations. Ground squirrels and marmots pass the winter in hibernation.

Eleven species of reptiles and four species of amphibians have been found in the park. Reptiles include the Great Basin rattlesnake, short-horned lizard, side-blotched lizard, striped whipsnake, and amphibians include the tiger salamander.

Also in the park are the black, lumpy, very slow-growing colonies of cryptobiotic soil, which are a mix of lichens, algae, fungi, and cyanobacteria. Together these organisms slow erosion, add nitrogen to soil, and help it to retain moisture.

Activities

Most park visitors sightsee using the scenic drive, which provides access to 13 viewpoints over the amphitheaters. Bryce Canyon has eight marked and maintained hiking trails that can be hiked in less than a day. The following list includes round trip time and trailhead for each in parentheses:

Easy to moderate hikes

Mossy Cave (one hour, State Route 12 northwest of Tropic)
Rim Trail (5–6 hours, anywhere on rim)
Bristlecone Loop (one hour, Rainbow Point), and Queens Garden (1–2 hours, Sunrise Point)

Moderate hikes

Navajo Loop (1–2 hours, Sunset Point)
Tower Bridge (2–3 hours, north of Sunrise Point)

Strenuous hikes

Fairyland Loop (4–5 hours, Fairyland Point)
Peekaboo Loop (3–4 hours, Bryce Point)

Several of the above trails intersect, allowing hikers to combine routes for more challenging hikes.

The park also has two trails designated for overnight hiking: the  Riggs Spring Loop Trail and the  Under-the-Rim Trail. Both require a backcountry camping permit.

The park also has a 7.4 magnitude night sky, making it one of the darkest in North America. Stargazers can, therefore, see 7,500 stars with the naked eye, while in most places fewer than 2,000 can be seen due to light pollution, and in many large cities only a few dozen can be seen. Park rangers host public stargazing events and evening programs on astronomy, nocturnal animals, and night sky protection. The Bryce Canyon Astronomy Festival, typically held in June, attracts thousands of visitors. In honor of this astronomy festival, Asteroid 49272 was named after the national park.

There are two campgrounds in the park: North Campground and Sunset Campground. Loop A in North Campground is open year-round. Additional loops and Sunset Campground are open from late spring to early autumn. The 114-room Bryce Canyon Lodge is another way to stay overnight in the park.

See also

 List of national parks of the United States

Notes

References

 (public domain text)

Further reading

External links

 
Bryce Canyon National Park Service information / U.S. Department of the Interior.
Bryce Canyon National Park: Hoodoos Cast Their Spell, a National Park Service Teaching with Historic Places (TwHP) lesson plan
Maps
Bryce Canyon National Park — slideshow by Life magazine

 
Religious places of the indigenous peoples of North America
Rock formations of Utah
Protected areas established in 1928
Civilian Conservation Corps in Utah
Badlands of the United States
Colorado Plateau
Protected areas of Garfield County, Utah
Protected areas of Kane County, Utah
National parks in Utah
Natural arches of Utah
1928 establishments in Utah
Landforms of Kane County, Utah
Landforms of Garfield County, Utah
Geographical articles missing image alternative text